Sweet Relief Musicians Fund is a nonprofit charity that maintains a financial fund from which professional musicians can draw when in need of medical care or financial needs. Initially intended as a one-time CD launch benefit for Victoria Williams, Sweet Relief has evolved into a charity organization that relies on donations from artists and the public as a general fund to all professional musicians in need. The fund provides financial assistance to all types of career musicians who are struggling with their finances while facing illness, disability, or age-related problems.

History

Founding and first CD release

The organization was started after musician and singer Victoria Williams was diagnosed with multiple sclerosis (MS) in 1993 and had no way to pay for her medical expenses. Money was raised through benefit concerts and the release of a CD, Sweet Relief: A Benefit for Victoria Williams, featuring artists like Lou Reed and Pearl Jam.

Second CD release

A second CD titled Sweet Relief II: Gravity of the Situation was released in 1996. All of the proceeds went toward Sweet Relief Musicians Fund to aid the organization. A variety of alternative rock artists volunteered their time to perform a variety of songs from Vic Chesnutt. Some well-known artists including Garbage, R.E.M., Hootie and the Blowfish, The Smashing Pumpkins, Joe Henry and Madonna performed for the CD.

Services
Sweet Relief provides service to the music community through financial assistance in the following categories:
Insurance Premiums
Prescriptions
Housing Costs
Food Costs
Alternative Therapies/Treatments not covered by insurance

Criteria for eligibility
Candidacy for assistance depends, among other factors, on the availability of funds and the number of eligible applicants, along with the following criteria:

The applicant must be a musician who has regular public performances, or performed on at least three widely released recordings (audio or audiovisual), or written music that has been performed on three widely released recordings, or published on three occasions.
The applicant must demonstrate financial need.
Older musicians that require short-term assistance for basic needs.
Except for retired or semi-retired older musicians, the applicant must have, or recently have had, a serious medical condition. A condition is considered to be serious when it substantially affects the applicant’s ability to work within or outside the music industry.

Exceptions may be made to any individual who does not meet these criteria but believes himself or herself to be eligible for assistance.

Management staff

Executives
Bill Bennett - President
Aric Steinberg - Vice President of Development & Artist Relations

Board of directors
Victoria Williams - Founder, Singer/songwriter and musician
J. Mark Matthews MD
Ariel Hyatt
David Bournasian
Paul Fox
Martin Kamenski
Matthew Kaplan

Advisory board
Jared Levy
Mike Rouse
Don Strasburg
Eric Pirritt
Benjamin Myers
Regius Gunawan
Keith Mitchell
Eric Mayers

Notable supporters
Sweet Relief Musicians Fund has worked with many notable musicians. A list of supporters, past and present, is shown below:

311
7th Order
A Perfect Circle
Aerosmith
Alan Jackson
Alanis Morissette
Alice Cooper
Ani DiFranco
Ashlee Simpson
Audioslave
Avril Lavigne
Barbra Streisand
Barry Manilow
BB King
Barenaked Ladies
Beastie Boys
Beck
Ben Harper
Bette Midler
Beyoncé
Billy Corgan
Billy Joel
Björk
Blink-182
Bob Dylan
Bonnie Raitt
Brad Paisley
Brian Setzer
Brian Wilson
Britney Spears
Brooks & Dunn
Bruce Springsteen
Celine
Cher
Chicago
Christina Aguilera
Chuck Schuldiner
Coldplay
Cypress Hill
Dave Matthews Band
Dave Navarro
David Bowie
Death
Destiny's Child
Dixie Chicks
Dolly Parton
Duran Duran
Eagles
Earth, Wind & Fire
Elton John
Eminem
EMI
Emmylou Harris
Fugees
Gloria Estefan
Godsmack
Good Charlotte
Grant-Lee Phillips
Gretchen Wilson
Heart
Hootie & the Blowfish
Hot Hot Heat
Ice Cube
Incubus
Indigo Girls
Jack Johnson
Jackson Browne
Janet Jackson
Jeff Tweedy
Jerry Cantrell
Jerry Lee Lewis
Jewel
Jimmy Buffett
Jimmy Eat World
John Mellencamp
Johnny Mathis
Jon Bon Jovi
Juanes
Justin Timberlake
Keith Urban
Kelly Clarkson
Kenny Chesney
Kiss
Korn
Lenny Kravitz
Linkin Park
Loggins & Messina
Los Lobos
Lou Reed
Madonna
Mariah Carey
Marilyn Manson
Matisyahu
Matchbox Twenty
Melissa Etheridge
Merle Haggard
Michelle Branch
Mötley Crüe
NSYNC
Nappy Roots
Natalie Cole
Neil Diamond
Neil Young
Nelly
New Found Glory
No Doubt
Norah Jones
The Offspring
Patti Smith
Pearl Jam
Pete Yorn
Peter Gabriel
Pink
The Pixies
Phish
P.O.D.
Puddle of Mudd
Queens of the Stone Age
Quincy Jones
Randy Newman
Reba McEntire
Red Hot Chili Peppers
R.E.M.
Ringo Starr
Rob Thomas
Santana
Sarah McLachlan
Shania Twain
The Smashing Pumpkins
Staind
Sting
The Strokes
System of a Down
Third Eye Blind
Tim McGraw
Tom Jones
Tom Petty
Tony Bennett
Trisha Yearwood
Van Halen
Vic Chesnutt
Victoria Williams
"Weird" Al Yankovic
Xzibit
Yanni
Yellowcard

Discography (benefit albums)
 Sweet Relief: A Benefit for Victoria Williams (1993)
 Sweet Relief II: Gravity of the Situation (1996) (Tribute to Vic Chesnutt)
 Sweet Relief III: Pennies From Heaven (2013)
Party for Joey:  Sweet Relief Tribute to Joey Spampinato (2021)

References

External links
Sweet Relief Musicians Fund

Charities based in California
Music organizations based in the United States